Mack Thompson may refer to:

Mack Thompson (musician), associate of Magic Sam
Mack Thompson, fictional character in Z Nation